rapid PHP Editor is a PHP Editor that incorporates many functions such as AutoComplete, Syntax checker, debugger and many other tools for fast PHP development. 

Rapid PHP Editor also contain other development tools for helping on HTML, CSS, Javascript and many other languages. 

Is part of a family of products covering most aspects of modern web development integrating as well many other capabilities used by developers.

Some features:
 (X)HTML to HTML5
 CSS to CSS3
 Code intelligence
 Powerful search and replace
 Support for several frameworks
 Code beautifier
 FTP Explorer (FTP/SFTP/FTPS)
 File explorer
 Database explorer
 Code snippets
 Validators and Debuggers
 FAST, real fast
 Many other tools available (many more to describe all here)

External links
 Rapid PHP Editor Official Website

Integrated development environments
Programming tools
Windows text editors